CORPUS is an international reformist organization in the Roman Catholic Church.  They support allowing married and single people of both sexes to become priests. See Clerical celibacy and Women's ordination.

CORPUS was started in Chicago in 1974 and is one of the oldest Catholic reformist groups in the United States.

See also
Call to Action
Catholic Church doctrine on the ordination of women
Leadership Conference of Women Religious
National Coalition of American Nuns
Women's Ordination Conference

References

External links
 

Christian organizations established in 1974
Catholic organizations established in the 20th century
Ordination of women and the Catholic Church
Criticism of the Catholic Church
Catholic dissident organizations